Charles Bell (1805 – 9 February 1869) was a British Conservative Party politician.

He was elected MP for City of London in November 1868 but died just four months later in February 1869.

References

External links
 

1805 births
1869 deaths
Conservative Party (UK) MPs for English constituencies
UK MPs 1868–1874